National Democratic Front of Boroland (D.R. Nabla faction) was one of the three factions of the National Democratic Front of Boroland, it was in peace talks with the Government of India along with the Progressive faction. In 2020, it was disbanded after signing a peace agreement with government

Objectives
The main objective of the outfit was to establish a Boro homeland.

Leaders
Ranjan Daimary aka D.R. Nabla, who is under house arrest currently represents as chairman of the faction.

Strength
579 militants of the faction,  including about 70 female were located in two designated camps established in Panbari, Dhubri District, and Udalguri Town. Some of the members of the faction had left it and joined the hardline faction which upholds sovereign existence of Boroland.

References

Politics of Assam
Left-wing militant groups in India